Jimmy Kite (born February 18, 1976 in Effingham, Illinois) is a retired American race car driver. He debuted in the Indy Racing League IndyCar Series in 1997 and has competed in 34 IndyCar races, including five Indianapolis 500s. In 2005, he intended to compete in the NASCAR Craftsman Truck Series and he made four starts before being called to replace the injured Paul Dana for Hemelgarn Racing in the IRL, where he completed the season after the Indy 500.

Largely out of racing since the end of the 2005 season, Kite founded JK Hobby World in November 2006. He failed in his attempt to qualify for the 2007 Indianapolis 500 in the PDM Racing #18 Panoz and failed to secure a ride for the 2008 race.

Motorsports career results

American open-wheel
(key) (Races in bold indicate pole position)

IndyCar

Indy 500 results

External links
 Jimmy Kite at ChampCarStats.com
 

1976 births
Living people
IndyCar Series drivers
Indianapolis 500 drivers
Indy Lights drivers
NASCAR drivers
ARCA Menards Series drivers
People from Effingham, Illinois
Racing drivers from Illinois
USAC Silver Crown Series drivers

Arrow McLaren SP drivers
PDM Racing drivers